Saleh Hussain (born 12 October 1936) is an Egyptian weightlifter. He competed in the men's lightweight event at the 1964 Summer Olympics.

References

1936 births
Living people
Egyptian male weightlifters
Olympic weightlifters of Egypt
Weightlifters at the 1964 Summer Olympics
Place of birth missing (living people)